Boys to Board is the 11th Our Gang short subject comedy released. The Our Gang series (later known as "The Little Rascals") was created by Hal Roach in 1922, and continued production until 1944.

Plot
A kindly old school teacher helps the gang escape from his wife's miserable boarding school.  While escaping, they run afoul of a bootlegger, who captures them and ties them up until the old school teacher rescues them just before the sheriff gets there.  The school teacher returns to the boarding school and demands better treatment for the boys.
|

See also
 Our Gang filmography

Notes
Mary Kornman does not appear in this film.

When the television rights for the original silent Pathé Our Gang comedies were sold to National Telepix and other distributors, several episodes were retitled. This film was released into TV syndication as Mischief Makers in 1960 under the title "Boarding School". About two-thirds of the original film was included. All of the original inter-titles were cut.

Cast

The Gang
 Joe Cobb as Joe
 Jackie Condon as Jackie
 Mickey Daniels as Mickey
 Jack Davis as Jack
 Allen Hoskins as Farina
 Ernie Morrison as Ernie 'Sunshine Sammy'
 Andy Samuel as Andy

Additional cast
 Richard Daniels as 'Pop' Malone
 Helen Gilmore as 'Mother' Malone
 Clara Guiol as Household Helper
 Wallace Howe as Sheriff
 Charles Stevenson as Moonshine Mose

External links 
 
 

1923 films
Hal Roach Studios short films
American silent short films
American black-and-white films
1923 comedy films
Our Gang films
1923 short films
1920s American films
Silent American comedy films